Olga Gennadyevna Vilukhina (born 22 March 1988) is a former Russian biathlete, who was competing on the World Cup circuit since the 2008–09 season.

Career
She has had four Top 10 finishes in World Cup races in individual races. Vilukhina was born in Mezhgorye, Bashkir ASSR, Soviet Union. She has won gold at 2006 Junior World Championships in Sprint. In the 2014 Winter Olympics in Sochi, she finished second in the sprint and was the first leg of the relay team which won silver.

Before the start of the 2014–2015 season the coach announced that Olga Vilukhina will miss him.

After lackluster results in 2015–2016, she announced the end of her career before the start of the 2016–2017 season, citing lack of motivation.

In December 2016, the IBU provisionally suspended her for doping violations during the 2014 Winter Olympics, along with Yana Romanova. On 27 November 2017, the IOC disqualified Vilukhina and Romanova, banned them for life from the Olympics, and stripped them of their Olympic medals. On 24 September 2020, Vilukhina's disqualificationin the individual races was overturned by the CAS, with her silver medal in the sprint restored.

Career results

Olympic Games

World Championships

World Cup

Podiums

References

External links

 

1988 births
Living people
People from Mezhgorye, Republic of Bashkortostan
Russian female biathletes
Biathletes at the 2014 Winter Olympics
Olympic biathletes of Russia
Biathlon World Championships medalists
Sportspeople from Bashkortostan
Doping cases in biathlon
Russian sportspeople in doping cases
Competitors stripped of Winter Olympics medals
Olympic silver medalists for Russia